Eber Priestley was the first successor of Frank Whittaker as Bishop in Medak.

Studies
Eber Priestley was a graduate of the University of Birmingham, Birmingham.

Writings
 The Church of South India: Adventure in Union
 The New Pattern of the Church: A Summary of Developments in the Diocese of Medak

References
Notes

Further reading
 
 
 
 
 

Telugu people
Anglican bishops of Medak
20th-century Anglican bishops in India
Indian Christian theologians
Alumni of the University of Birmingham
Living people
Year of birth missing (living people)
Church of South India clergy